Kopyevo (Khakas: Арға пазы, Arğa pazı) is a rural locality (a settlement) and the administrative center of Ordzhonikidzevsky District of the Republic of Khakassia, Russia. Population:

References

Notes

Sources

Rural localities in Khakassia